Nicholas Donin of La Rochelle, a Jewish convert to Christianity in early thirteenth-century Paris, is known for his role in the 1240 Disputation of Paris, which resulted in a decree for the public burning of all available manuscripts of the Talmud. Latin sources referred to him as "Repellus," referring to his native La Rochelle.

Excommunication 
In 1225, Donin was excommunicated from the ghetto of Paris by Rabbi Yechiel of Paris. While the precise reason for his excommunication is not known, Yechiel himself claims that it was because Donin had become a Karaite, rejecting the authority of the Talmud along with the Rabbinic tradition of biblical exegesis. After ten years of living in excommunication, Donin was baptized into the Roman Catholic Church and joined the Franciscan Order. Other sources, however, claim that he converted well before meeting Rabbi Yechiel of Paris.

Disputations

Authority of Pope Gregory IX 
In 1238 Donin went to Rome, presented himself before Pope Gregory IX, and denounced the Talmud. Thirty-five articles against the Talmud were drawn up, which Donin charged with making virulent attacks on the Virginity of Mary and the divinity of Jesus.

The Pope was persuaded that the accusations were true and dispatched to the authorities of the Church transcripts of the charges formulated by Donin, accompanied by an order to seize all copies of the Talmud and deposit them with the Dominicans and Franciscans. If an examination corroborated the charges of Donin, the scrolls were to be burned.

Authority of King Louis IX 

This order was generally ignored, except in France, where the Jews were compelled under pain of death to surrender their Talmuds (March, 1240). Louis IX ordered four of the most distinguished rabbis of France—Yechiel of Paris, Moses of Coucy, Judah of Melun, and Samuel ben Solomon of Château-Thierry—to answer Donin in a public debate. The rabbis were forbidden from denying the holiness of Jesus or Mary, as well as disputing any other central Christian doctrine, and Donin was declared victorious by the Christian officials presiding. Following the disputation, Louis IX  condemned the Talmud to be burned.  In 1242, fire was set accordingly to twenty-four carriage loads (ten to twelve-thousand volumes) of written works.

See also
 Criticism of the Talmud
 Jacob Brafman
 Johannes Pfefferkorn

References

Bibliography 
 Solomon ibn Verga, Shevet Yehudah, ed. Wiener, p. 114;
 A. Lewin, in Monatsschrift, 1869, pp. 9 et seq.:
 Isidore Loeb, in Rev. Et. Juives, i. 247 et seq.;
 Johann Christoph Wagenseil, Tela Ignea Satanæ;
 Heinrich Graetz, Geschichte vii. 94 et seq.
 Hyam Maccoby, Judaism on Trial (1981, Littman Library of Jewish Civilisation)
 
 John Friedman, Jean Connell Hoff, Robert Chazen, The Trial of the Talmud: Paris, 1240 ,(2012 PIMS)

Further reading
 Alexander Kisch: Pope Gregory the Ninth Article indictment against the Talmud and its defense by Rabbi Jachiel and Rabbi Joseph ben Judah ben David from Saint Louis in Paris . Leipzig in 1874.
 Isidore Loeb: La controverse sur le Talmud sous saint Louis,  Paris: Baer, 1881.
 Judah M. Rosenthal: The Talmud on Trial: The disputation at Paris in the Year 1240 . In: The Jewish Quarterly Review, 47/1 (1956), pp. 58–76, 47/1 (1956), pp. 145–169.
 Bernhard Garland: Jewish and Christian converts in the Judeo-Christian religious discussion of the Middle Ages . In: Miscellanea Medievalia 4 (1966), pp. 264–282.
 Jeremy Cohen, Friars and the Jews: Evolution of Mediaeval Anti-Judaism . Ithaca, 1982, .
 Kurt Schubert : Apostasy from identity crisis - Nicholas Donin . In: Cairo. Journal of Jewish Studies and Religious Studies, 30/31 (1988/89), pp. 1–10.
 Israel Jacob Yuval : Two nations in your womb. Mutual Perceptions of Jews and Christians in Late Antiquity and the Middle Ages . Göttingen 2007. .
 Judah M. Rosenthal:  Donin, Nicholas in Encyclopaedia Judaica, 2nd Edition, Volume 5, Detroit, New York etc. 2007, p 750.

External links
 https://web.archive.org/web/20070427200333/http://www.canalsocial.net/GER/ficha_GER.asp?id=11677&cat=religionnocristiana
 http://www.jewishencyclopedia.com/articles/5277-donin-nicholas-of-la-rochelle
 http://www.michtavim.com/RMRYehielParis.pdf

Year of birth missing
Year of death missing
Converts to Roman Catholicism from Judaism
French Roman Catholics
Jewish French history
Critics of Judaism
13th-century French Jews
People from Paris
French Franciscans
People excommunicated by synagogues
Talmud translators